Figuerola is a Hispanic surname. Notable people with the surname include:
Agustín Figuerola (born 1985), Argentine rugby union footballer 
Enrique Figuerola (born 1938), Cuban sprinter 
Justo Figuerola (1771–1854), President of Peru
Sebastià Figuerola (1919–1996), Catalan composer

See also
Figuerola del Camp, a municipality in Tarragona, Catalonia, Spain

Spanish-language surnames